The Chevrolet Monte Carlo is a two-door coupe that was manufactured and marketed by the Chevrolet division of General Motors. Deriving its name from the city in Monaco, the Monte Carlo was marketed as the first personal luxury car of the Chevrolet brand. Introduced for the 1970 model year, the model line was produced across six generations through the 2007 model year, with a hiatus from 1989 to 1994. The Monte Carlo was a closely aligned variant of the Pontiac Grand Prix through its entire production.

From 1970 until 1972, the Monte Carlo rode on the unique "A-Special" platform with the Grand Prix, shifting to the standard A-body intermediate chassis for 1973–1977. For 1978, the model line underwent extensive downsizing but was still considered a midsized coupe. The rear-wheel drive A-body platform underpinning this generation of Monte Carlo was redesignated as the G-body when GM's front-wheel drive A-body cars were introduced for 1982. After an abbreviated 1988 model year, the Monte Carlo was replaced by the two-door Chevrolet Lumina.

For the 1995 model year, the Monte Carlo was revived, replacing the two-door Lumina. Sharing the front-wheel drive W-platform with the two-door Grand Prix, the Monte Carlo was again slotted above the Camaro as the largest Chevrolet coupe. Following the discontinuation of the four-door Lumina in 2000, the Chevrolet Impala became the four-door equivalent of the Monte Carlo. After the 2002 model year, the Grand Prix coupe was discontinued, leaving the Monte Carlo as the largest two-door coupe produced by an American auto manufacturer.

In response to declining sales of the model line, Chevrolet discontinued the Monte Carlo after the 2007 model year. During much of its production, the Monte Carlo represented the Chevrolet brand in stock car racing. During the 1980s, the Monte Carlo SS was introduced, featuring aerodynamically-enhanced styling; as part of its revival, the Monte Carlo again represented Chevrolet in stock car racing from 1995 through its discontinuation.

Development
For the 1968 model year, GM instituted a split-wheelbase policy for its A-platform intermediate-sized cars. This gave the design an unusually long hood design helping the new Grand Prix to outsell its larger B-body predecessor, despite higher prices. The new layout was first known as the A-body Special, but would evolve into its own class known as the G-platform.

The Monte Carlo started as Chevrolet's version of Pontiac Grand Prix, as conceived by Elliot M. (Pete) Estes, general manager of Chevrolet, and Chevrolet's chief stylist, David Holls, giving Chevrolet and Pontiac an alternative to the E-body Buick Riviera and  Oldsmobile Toronado. They modeled the styling on the contemporary Cadillac Eldorado, although much of the body and structure were shared with the Chevrolet Chevelle (firewall, windshield, decklid, and rear window were the same). New exterior "coke bottle styling" featured concealed windshield wipers. A fiber-optic exterior light monitoring system was optional.

A mid-1990s article in the magazine Chevrolet High Performance stated that the first generation Monte Carlo was known to Chevrolet management under the working name Concours. The usual practice at the time was that all Chevrolet model development names started with a "C". At one point, the proposal called for a formal coupe, sedan, and convertible. It has been noted that the sedan resembled a full-size Oldsmobile 98 prior to the use of the GM G platform with at least one photo showing the pull-up door handles that would be introduced on the 1970½ Camaro and 1971 Vega and full-sized Chevys, but not appear on Monte Carlos until the second-generation model debuted in 1973. When the car debuted for the 1970 model year, the only body style available was the two-door hardtop.

Though the Monte Carlo was developed at Chevrolet under the leadership of Pete Estes, it was formally introduced in September 1969 by John Z. DeLorean, who succeeded Estes as Chevrolet's general manager earlier in the year after previously heading the Pontiac division, where he led the development of the Series 276 Grand Prix.

First generation (1970–1972)

1970
The styling of the 1970 model-year Monte Carlo is distinguished by its chromed rectangular grille having a fine grid pattern of 720 small squares with two horizontal dividers and centered in it was a chrome and red crest emblem adorned by a Corinthian helmet (commonly referred to as the "knight's crest"), a thin hood spear with no vertical hood ornament, round headlamps with rounded chrome bezels (which appeared on a prototype 1970 Chevelle front end proposal which was rejected for the 4 headlight design), circular parking lamps inset into the front bumper directly below the headlamps, and tail lights with chrome trim around the perimeter of the lens, only.

The standard powertrain was the  Chevrolet "Turbo-Fire" small-block V8 with a two-barrel carburetor, rated at 250 hp (186 kW) (gross) at 4500 rpm and 345 lb·ft (468 Nm) of torque at 2800 rpm, mated to a column-mounted 3-speed Synchro-Mesh manual transmission. Front disc brakes were standard equipment. The dashboard was basically identical to the Chevelle except for simulated wood veneer trim, according to Holls a photographic reproduction of the elm trim used by Rolls-Royce, and higher grade nylon or vinyl upholstery and deep-twist carpeting were used. Base priced at US$3,123 ($ in  dollars ), the Monte Carlo cost $218 more than a comparable Chevelle Malibu ($ in  dollars ) while priced lower to a Chevrolet Caprice Sport Coupe.

Various options were available. A two-speed Powerglide automatic transmission (on 350 CID engines only), three-speed Turbo-Hydramatic, or a four-speed manual; most Monte Carlos were built with the Turbo-Hydramatic. Variable-ratio power steering, power windows, air conditioning, power seats, "rally" wheels, bucket seats, center console, full instrumentation, rear wheel fender skirts and other accessories were also available, bringing the price of a fully equipped Monte Carlo to more than $5,000 ($ in  dollars ).

Optional engines included the four-barrel carbureted Turbo-Fire 350 CID small block V8, rated at 300 hp (224 kW) at 4800 rpm and 380 lb·ft (515 Nm) at 3200 rpm, the Turbo-Fire 400 (400 CID/6.5 L) with a two-barrel carburetor, rated at 265 hp (198 kW) at 4800 rpm and 400 lb·ft (542 Nm) at 3800 rpm, and the Turbo-Jet 400 (402 CID/6.6 L) with a four-barrel carburetor, rated at 330 hp (246 kW) at 4800 rpm and 410 lb·ft (555 Nm) at 3200 rpm. Note that the two Chevrolet 400 CID V8s offered this year were actually two different designs. The two-barrel carbureted Turbo-Fire 400 was a Small Block Chevrolet V8 engine, similar, but different internally, to the 350, while the Turbo-Jet 400 was a slightly enlarged version of the 396 CID big block V8 and had an actual displacement of 402 CID.

The sporty and most powerful option was the Monte Carlo SS 454 package. It also included heavy-duty suspension, wider tires, "SS 454" badging, and an automatic load-leveling rear suspension. The Turbo Hydra-Matic three-speed automatic was the only transmission available for this package. The rear axle came standard with a 3.06 ratio, with 2.56 and 3.31 available for $222 extra. The SS 454s were not popular with 3,823 units built for the year.

A labor strike at Chevrolet's Flint, Michigan, assembly plant (where most Monte Carlo production was scheduled) during the early months of the 1970 model year immediately following the car's introduction on September 18, 1969, limited overall model-year sales to 159,341; short of the projected 185,000. During those early months, Monte Carlos were in short supply, with full-scale production not happening until February 1970, leaving many would-be buyers disappointed after going to their Chevrolet dealers and finding no Monte Carlos in stock. Once full production was underway, Monte Carlos sold well and often at full list price (usually being ordered with many extra-cost options), making it a profitable model for Chevrolet and its dealership networks.

Popular Mechanics reported 82% of readers who bought a Monte Carlo got one for the styling, however 10.1% of readers disliked the amount of rear leg room. The Better Call Saul character Lalo Salamanca primarily drives a 1970 Chevrolet Monte Carlo.

1971

The 1971 model saw minor styling changes, mostly cosmetic. The headlamp bezels were more of a squircle shape with rectangular front parking lamps. The grille had no horizontal divider and the openings were rectangular-shaped. The hood spear included a stand-up ornament with “Chevrolet” script lettering. The grill emblem featured the year, "1971" in Roman numerals. The trunk lock keyhole had the Monte Carlo crest surrounding it. The taillights now had two horizontal and one vertical chrome strips. Inside, the SS model got new "European symbol knobs", and a four-spoke steering wheel became optional. AM/FM stereo radios with 8-track tape players were also optional. Mechanically it was largely unchanged, although the small-block Turbo-Fire 400 two-barrel engine was dropped. Other engines had compression ratios lowered to allow the use of regular leaded, low-lead, or unleaded gasoline, per a GM corporate edict. Engine ratings fell to 245 hp (183 kW) for the base Turbo-Fire 350 CID (5.7 L) two-barrel, 270 hp (201 kW) for the Turbo-Fire 350-4V, and 300 hp (224 kW) for the Turbo-Jet 400. The SS 454 engine was actually raised to a nominal 365 gross hp (272 kW) despite the reduction in compression ratio. This increase in horsepower was a result of the 454 engine using the more aggressive camshaft from the 390 hp 454 used in the 1970 Chevrolet Corvette and full-sized sedans.

Chevrolet listed both gross and SAE net horsepower figures in 1971 with the impending change to SAE net ratings in 1972. The ratings compared as follows:

The SS 454 package would be discontinued after this year following the production of 1,919 units, but the 454 CID V8 engine would remain optional in Monte Carlos through 1975. The reason given for discontinuing the SS was that the Monte Carlo was marketed as a luxury vehicle instead of a muscle car. The SS nameplate would be resurrected 12 years later. Yet, at the same time that the Monte Carlo SS was judged a failure in the marketplace and discontinued, the models' reputation as a performance car on the race track was gaining strength because Ford and Chrysler were ending their factory-backed racing support due to declining muscle car sales and the need to divert dollars to meet federal safety and emission regulations (General Motors' official policy had prohibited factory racing efforts since 1963). As factory support ended at Ford and Chrysler, the stock-car racing mantle switched to independent teams and sponsors, who overwhelmingly chose Chevrolets over Ford and Chrysler products due to Chevy's much greater availability and affordability of over-the-counter racing parts through the Chevy dealer network. The Monte Carlo was considered the best-suited Chevrolet model for stock car racing by most NASCAR teams due to its  wheelbase (only one inch above NASCAR's minimum requirements at that time, the Chevelle 2-doors had a shorter 112-inch wheelbase) and long-hood design which placed the engine further back in the chassis than most other vehicles for better weight distribution. Thus the Monte Carlo became Chevy's standard-bearer for NASCAR from 1971 until 1989.

Production of the 1971 Monte Carlo got off to a slow start due to a 67-day corporate-wide walkout (labor strike) that coincided with the introduction of the 1971 models in September 1970. This left dealerships with only a small shipment of 1971 models (built before the strike) in stock until the strike was settled in mid-November 1970, and then slow-going in reaching normal production levels until around January 1, 1971. Model-year production ended at 128,600 including the 1,919 SS models.

A total of 12 1971 Monte Carlo's were shipped to Australia in 1971 and converted to RH drive, 4 of these were SS models from the 1,919 produced.

1972
A Cadillac-like egg-crate grille similar to the 1971 Chevrolet Caprice, rectangular front parking lamps moved to the left and right edges of the grille, a wider hood spear without stand-up ornament, and a metal rear trim molding highlighted the changes to the 1972 Monte Carlo, the final year for the first-generation design. The SS was dropped, but a new Monte Carlo Custom option appeared as a one-year-only offering that included a special suspension and other items previously included with the SS option. Unlike the departed SS package, it was available with any engine on the roster. The Monte Carlo Custom badging was similar to the Impala Custom.

The engines were largely unchanged, but an industry-wide switch to SAE net hp numbers led to a reduction in the rated power of all Chevrolet engines. Chevrolet did not list gross horsepower figures for 1972. Compared to the 1971 model year output, only the 402 and 454 had a decrease in power. The new ratings for the Monte Carlo were:

In California, which had emissions standards more stringent than federal law, the 4-barrel carbureted 350 was the standard and only available engine. Also, the only transmission offered in California was the Turbo Hydramatic.

For 1972, the four-speed manual transmission was discontinued from the option list as a line in the Monte Carlo brochure describing its market position as a personal luxury car stated "Sorry, no four-on-the-floor." The standard three-speed manual and optional two-speed Powerglide automatic transmissions were offered only with the base 350 CID two-barrel engine, with the three-speed Turbo Hydramatic also available with this engine and a mandatory option with each of the optional engines.

Mechanically, the most significant change was that variable-ratio power steering became standard equipment for the first time.

Interior trim was relatively unchanged from 1971 other than the availability of all-vinyl upholstery with the standard bench seat in addition to the optional Strato bucket seats. Cloth interiors were also offered with both bench and bucket seats. The 1972 model year's production increased to 180,819 to set a new record in the final year for the first-generation A-body. Monte Carlo and other Chevrolet models were promoted as part of a new ad campaign in which Chevys in print and broadcast ads were featured at various tourist attractions and sites around the United States under the tagline "Chevrolet: Building a Better Way To See The USA."

Second generation (1973–1977)

1973
A redesigned Monte Carlo was introduced alongside other GM intermediates. Like other GM mid-size cars, the 1973 Monte Carlo was no longer a hardtop, but a pillared "Colonnade" coupe with rear side opera windows and frameless door glass. Prominent styling features included an egg-crate grille with a Monte Carlo emblem in front and vertical taillights above the bumper. The front bumper was a large federally mandated  bumper that was among the required 1973 federal safety standards for all passenger cars sold in the U.S. with the  requirement extended to rear bumpers on 1974 models. Also new was a double-shell roof for improved noise reduction and rollover protection along with the flush-mounted pull-up exterior door handles first introduced on the 1970½ Camaro and 1971 full-sized Chevrolets and Vegas.

The separate body-on-frame construction carried over for 1973, as was the basic all-coil suspension. For improved ride and handling, the 1973 Monte Carlo featured a number of innovations (for a large American car) such as standard radial-ply tires, Pliacell shock absorbers, high-caster steering, and front and rear anti-roll bars (previously offered only with the SS package). The standard Monte Carlo with manual transmission retained "traditional" steering and bias-ply tires, but the radial-tuned system was included when the automatic transmission was ordered, earning the Monte Carlo S label.

A new model for 1973 was the Monte Carlo Landau, which was basically an "S" with a rear quarter Landau vinyl roof, Turbine II wheels as well as driver and passenger-side sport mirrors. The interior of the 1973 Monte Carlo featured an all-new, wraparound cockpit-style instrument panel, similar to that found in some contemporary Pontiacs, Oldsmobiles and Buicks, in which gauges and various instruments were centered within easy reach of the driver. The simulated burl elm trim was retained. A split bench seat was standard, but "Strato Bucket" seats of a new design were optional, along with a floor console featuring an equally new shifter with knob and button similar to Pontiac's Rally Sports Shifter replacing the Buick-like horseshoe shifter of previous years, and storage compartment. The bucket seats were of a one-piece high-back design with built-in headrests and could swivel almost 90 degrees to permit the driver and front passenger easier entry and exit, a feature previously offered on the 1962 Chrysler 300H. Cloth and vinyl trims were offered with both the bench and bucket seats.

The standard engine was a  net 350 CID (5.7 L) Turbo-Fire V8. Optional engines included a  net 350 CID V8 with a four-barrel carburetor and a four-barrel carbureted 454 CID Turbo-Jet V8 rated at  net.

The 1973 Monte Carlo was named "Car of the Year" by Motor Trend on the basis of its new styling and emphasis on Euro-style ride and handling. The 1973 Monte Carlo set a new sales record for Chevrolet, with nearly 250,000 sold for the model year. The success of the Monte Carlo and Pontiac's similar Grand Prix led to several new personal luxury cars from competitors, including a revised Mercury Cougar, the Ford Gran Torino Elite, the Chrysler Cordoba, and restyled Dodge Charger as well as high-line versions of the AMC Matador that introduced a new coupe design for 1974.

1974

The 1974 Monte Carlo received minor detail changes from its 1973 predecessor, most notably a revised egg-crate grille in the front, flush mount taillights (no longer recessed with horizontal chrome bars), a shorter trunk deck that housed the relocated license plate and the trunk lock mechanism. In 1973 the trunk lock was below the trunk deck and above the rear bumper in a space that no longer existed on the 1974 versions. A larger  rear bumper was added and in the interior, the driver and passenger door map pockets were no longer available.

The base Monte Carlo with a manual transmission, standard suspension, and bias-ply tires was discontinued, leaving only the "S" and "Landau" models equipped with radial-ply tires and upgraded suspensions along with standard power steering and front disc brakes.

A three-speed manual transmission was listed as standard equipment on 1974 "S" and "Landau" models equipped with the standard 350 CID V8, and an automatic transmission was a required option with the larger 400 and 454 CID V8s. However, a number of sources indicate that Chevrolet built almost all 1974 Monte Carlos with the Turbo Hydra-Matic transmission.

For Californians, the standard engine was a 350 Turbo-Fire V8 with a four-barrel carburetor rated at  that was not offered in the other 49 states. The top engine was again the 454 CID Turbo-Jet big block V8 rated at 235 hp (183 kW).

Despite the Arab Oil Embargo of late 1973 and early 1974 that greatly cut into sales of standard and intermediate-sized cars in favor of smaller compacts and imported subcompacts, the Monte Carlo went the other way on the sales charts by setting a new sales record this year of over 300,000 units despite the long lines at gas stations and record-high gasoline prices. The Monte Carlo continued to lead in intermediate personal luxury car sales with the Grand Prix placing second and the arrival of new competitors this year, including an upsized Mercury Cougar, Ford Gran Torino Elite, and AMC's Matador coupe. Chrysler would introduce its entries in this field for 1975 including the Chrysler Cordoba and redesigned Dodge Charger.

Interior Dimensions

1975

The 1975 Monte Carlo received only minor styling changes from the 1974 model, including a new grille with the Monte Carlo emblem moved to the center section and new vertically shaped taillights with horizontal louvers. All models received catalytic converters to meet Federal and California emission requirements that included bonuses such as improved fuel economy and drivability, along with longer spark plug and muffler life, but required lower-octane unleaded gasoline.

Engines were a carryover from 1974 except for the addition of GM's High Energy electronic ignition being made standard equipment. However, power ratings for all engines were decreased due to the addition of the catalytic converter. The 454 CID V8 was no longer offered on California cars, leaving the 400 CID four-barrel the top engine in that market. A three-speed manual transmission was standard equipment with the base 350 CID V8 used in 49 states and California-only 350 four-barrel V8. The Turbo Hydra-Matic was optional and a required option for the 400 and 454 V8s. Company sources claim that all 1975 Monte Carlos were equipped with the Turbo Hydra-Matic transmission, which became standard equipment for 1976.

New for 1975 was a Custom interior option that included a plusher cloth 50/50 bench seat with recliner on the passenger side and lower door panel carpeting. The standard interior still consisted of a bench seat with knit-cloth and vinyl or all-vinyl upholstery. The swiveling Strato bucket seats plus console and floor shifter were still optional with a knit cloth or vinyl upholstery. Also, white all-vinyl interiors were available for the first time this year with either bench or bucket seats with contrasting colors for carpeting and instrument panels including black, red, blue, and green. A gauge that showed if one was using too much gas, a part of the "Economider" Gauge package, became optional.

Sales dropped off a bit from 1974's record-setting pace due to higher prices resulting from the addition of the catalytic converter, double-digit inflation, and new competition from Chrysler's Cordoba and Dodge's Charger SE. Monte Carlo production ended up at around 250,000 units but would rebound to set a new record in 1976.

1976

A new crosshatch grille and vertically mounted rectangular headlamps, along with reshaped taillights identified the 1976 Monte Carlo (the reshaped taillight pattern was later incorporated into the fourth generation Monte Carlo). Under the hood, a new  305 CID 2-barrel V8 became the standard engine with the  350 2-barrel V8 and  400 CID V8 both optional. California cars got a  350 4-barrel as the base engine (not available in 49 states), and could be equipped with the 400 4-barrel V8. The big-block 454 CID V8 was discontinued from the option list this year. The Turbo Hydramatic transmission became standard equipment on all 1976 Monte Carlos.

Interior trims remained the same as 1975 with both base and Custom levels, but the instrument panel and steering wheel featured a new rosewood trim replacing the burled elm of previous years. A new option was a two-toned "Fashion Tone" paint combination. Monte Carlo sales hit an all-time record with 353,272 units this year.
191,370 "S" Coupes were made.
161,902 Landau Coupes, which were $293 more.

1977

A revised grille with smaller segments with the Monte Carlo "knight's crest" emblem moved to a stand-up hood ornament and revised taillight lenses marked the 1977 Monte Carlo, which was the last year for the 1973-vintage design before the introduction of a downsized 1978 Monte Carlo. Engine offerings were reduced to two engines for 1977. The base engine for 49 states was the  305 CID 2-barrel V8 and the  350 4-barrel V8 was optional (standard in California). The 400-cubic-inch V8 was dropped as an engine option. The Turbo Hydra-Matic transmission was included standard equipment.

Interior trim received only minor revisions this year with upholstery choices including cloth, velour, and vinyl in both base and Custom trims. Swivel-out front seats and an 8-track tape player were optional. This model year marks the only time in history when an intermediate model was larger in every dimension than a full-sized model, as the B-body Chevrolet Caprice/Impala had already been redesigned and downsized for 1977. The Monte Carlo also weighed more. In 1977 sales totaled 224,327 S coupes and 186,711 Landau coupes.

Third generation (1978–1980)

1978 

All GM intermediate-sized cars including the Monte Carlo were downsized for the 1978 model year in response to the 1973 Arab Oil Embargo and CAFE requirements. The 1978 model was 700-800 lb lighter and 15 inches shorter than the 1977 model. The 1978 model also had more interior and trunk space than the earlier 1977 model. The engines offered in previous years were dropped in favor of a standard 231 CID V6 built by Buick or an optional Chevrolet 305 CID V8. New one-piece wall-to-wall carpeting was standard. The three-speed manual transmission reappeared for the first time in several years as standard equipment on the base model with the V6 engine, and the automatic was optional. The optional V8 and all Landau models came standard with the automatic. A four-speed manual transmission with floor shifter was optional with the 305 V8, the first time a four-speed manual was offered on the Monte Carlo since 1971.

1979 

Minor trim changes were made to the 1979 Monte Carlo which included a restyled grille, revised parking lamp detail, and new wrap-around taillamps. Mechanical changes included a new Chevrolet-built 200 CID V6 as the standard engine for the base Monte Carlo in 49 states while the Buick 231 CID V6 remained standard on base models in California and all Landau models. A new  267 CID V8 became optional and the  305 CID V8 continued as an option but was joined by a 160 hp  version with a four-barrel carburetor. The same transmissions were carried over from 1978, including a standard three-speed manual and optional four-speed manual, or an optional three-speed Turbo Hydramatic automatic. 1979 would be the last year that Chevrolet would offer manual transmissions on the Monte Carlo due to extremely low buyer interest. A black 1979 Monte Carlo was used by Michael Platt and William Matix during the 1986 FBI Miami shootout. A 1979 Monte Carlo modified to a lowrider, was also heavily featured in the 2001 movie Training Day. The car was driven by the main character Detective Alonzo Harris, played by actor Denzel Washington.

1980 

For 1980, the car received a mild frontal restyle, with quad headlights and turn indicators mounted beneath. The metric 200 3-speed automatic transmission became standard on all models and a new Chevrolet-built 229 CID V6 with 2-barrel Rochester carburetor replaced both the 200 CID V6 of 1979 and the Buick engine offered on all 1978 models and the 1979 Landau as the standard engine in 49 states (California cars continued to use the Buick engine). The front headroom was 37.6 inches, while rear headroom was 37.8 inches. A power trunk opener was still optional. There were a total of 13,839 turbo Monte Carlo's for 1980. A new five-slot, 14-inch rally wheel option was introduced (the slots having squared ends and a pointed edge), this was later shared with subsequent Chevrolet/GMC A/G-bodies and the Chevrolet S10 light-duty truck.

Production Figures:

Fourth generation (1981–1988)

1981 
The body was restyled with the other GM mid-size formal coupes (Oldsmobile Cutlass Supreme, Pontiac Grand Prix, Buick Regal). It featured a smoother profile than the previous models and new vertical taillights similar to the 1973–1977 models. Engine offerings were carried over, including the standard 229 CID Chevrolet V6 (231 CID Buick V6 in California) an optional 267 CID V8 (not available in California), a 305 CID V8 in the base and Landau models, and a turbocharged  231 CID Buick V6 in the Monte Carlo Turbo. 

There were a total of 3,027 Monte Carlo Turbos for 1981. The Monte Carlo Turbo appeared slightly different from other Monte Carlos that year because in addition to the turbo motor it also was equipped with a small hood scoop on the left side of the hood. It also had Turbo 3.8 badges with a Chevrolet bowtie on the sides of the hood scoop, on the trunk lid, and on the right side of the dash. An automatic transmission, power steering, and power front disc brakes were standard equipment. 

While this car was considered by some to be much better looking (and appeared more aerodynamic) than its Buick Regal, Pontiac Grand Prix, and Olds Cutlass cousins, only one team tried to make a go of it in NASCAR cup racing. While the big Monte Carlo was the dominant body style in the late 1970s, winning 30 or so races, the downsized (and cleaned-up) 1981 body would only take two checkered flags in the 1981 and 1982 seasons when it was run.

1982 
Few revisions were made on the 1982 Monte Carlo. All engines, except for the turbocharged 231 CID V6, which was discontinued along with the Monte Carlo Turbo model, were carried over from 1981. New for 1982 were the additions of a 260 CID V6 and an Oldsmobile 350 CID V8, both of which were diesel engines. With the introduction of GM's new mid-size platform that saw the introduction of the Buick Century, Chevrolet Celebrity, Oldsmobile Cutlass Ciera, and Pontiac 6000, the chassis designations were changed. The new mid-size cars were designated as A-body cars, whereas the cars previously designated as A-bodies were now called G-bodies. A black exterior was not offered in 1982 and also not available in 1982 for the first time in Monte Carlo history was a sportier interior option with Strato bucket seats and console, as only the standard notchback bench or optional 55/45 bench were offered this year. Weight distribution was 57% in the front and 43% in the rear.

1983 

Receiving only minor updates, the 1983 model year Monte Carlo gained a revised grille and interior trim patterns. The standard engine continued to be the 229 in3 V6, and the 165 hp 305 in3 V8 was optional. The Super Sport Package, Z65, was once again made an option in 1983. The Monte Carlo SS was reintroduced in 1983, following twelve years of being discontinued. The Monte Carlo SS featured European body color-coding, a new front fascia, a rear spoiler, and a V8.

1984 

The 1984 year model coupe production totaled 112,730 with an additional 24,050 had the SS option (with a  305 V8 that saw a  boost from the previous year). The Monte Carlo SS was available with Strato bucket seats and floor console as extra-cost options for the first time in place of the standard split bench seat with armrest (the Strato buckets also returned as an option on the regular Monte after a two-year absence). The regular Monte Carlo came standard with a  229 CID V6 (231 CID V6 for California) and a  305 V8 was optional. Available for the last year in a base Monte Carlo was the 350 CID diesel engine, and there were only 168 manufactured. 

All engines for 1984 got the three-speed automatic transmission with the exception of three SSs at the end of the 1984 production run that received the Turbo Hydramatic 200-4R transmission with overdrive. In 1984, there were a limited number of Monte Carlo SSs made in Mexico, for Mexican sale. The differences are many compared to US/Canadian SSs. There was no rear spoiler. The wheels were 14-inch checker style, an option on the base Monte Carlos in the US. The side mirrors are a different style and black. The interior is from a Grand Prix and is blue in color. The engine was a 350 CID V8, and the transmission was a 4-speed manual with a Hurst shifter.

1985 
For 1985, T-tops were re-introduced since they were discontinued after the 1983 model year, while additional SS colors (black, maroon, and silver in addition to white), pinstriping, and options were made available. The (later to be highly sought after) medium blue ("gunmetal") color for the SS was dropped. A four-speed automatic overdrive transmission, the Turbo Hydramatic 200-4R, with a revised sport rear axle ratio with a 3.73:1 gear became standard on the SS. Gone for good were the 229 CID V6 and 350 CID V8 diesel engines. Introduced in place of the 229 CID V6 was a 262 CID (4.3 L) V6 (RPO LB4) that was fuel-injected with throttle-body fuel injection. The small block 305 5.0 liter V8's were fitted with computer-controlled 2-barrel Quadrajet carburetors that include an automatic choke for easy engine turn over and start. 

The 1985 Chevrolet Monte Carlo, Chevy's rear-wheel-drive personal-luxury car, got more power, but for the first time since 1981, no diesel engine was offered in the Monte Carlo. On the base model, the previously standard 3.8 L Chevy V6 gave way to a larger 4.3 L V6 with throttle-body fuel injection. That brought 20 extra horsepower, to a total of 130. The optional 5.0 L V8 likewise gained some horsepower, via a jump in compression ratio. It jumped from 150 horsepower to 165. The High Output 5.0 L V8 in the 1985 Chevrolet Monte Carlo SS remained at 180 horsepower. 10.5-inch front disc brakes were standard along with drum brakes on the rear. A/C was $730. The V6 and base V8 were available with either a three- or four-speed automatic transmission, but the H.O. V8 in the SS came only with a four-speed automatic this year. The base coupe carried on visually unchanged except for pin-striping and optional T-tops or a vinyl-covered roof. The SS version was modified. Previously offered only in white or dark blue metallic, color choices were expanded to include silver, maroon, and black. "Removable glass roof panels" (T-tops) came on board as a midyear option. Nearly 120,000 Monte Carlos found eager buyers in 1985. Though the total was down from 1984, the SS model saw sales climb from 24,050 to 35,484. The 1985 Monte Carlo SS also came with a 35-millimeter sway bar for extra support.

1986 

For 1986, there were four distinct body styles available. The base model Sport Coupe was still available with the same general body panels that it had since 1981, but featured new "aero" side mirrors similar to those on Camaros and Chevrolet Corvette of the 1980s. New for the 1986 model year was a Luxury Sport model that had a revised front fascia, new "aero" side mirrors, and an updated sleek-looking rear fascia. The LS front fascia included "Euro" headlights with removable bulbs in a glass composite headlamp housing, versus the smaller sealed beam glass headlights of previous years. The rear bumper of the LS no longer had a "notch" between the bumper and trunk, and the taillights wrapped around so that they were visible from the sides of the car. The Super Sport model for 1986 incorporated the "aero" mirrors, yet still utilized the prior year's styling for the rear bumper. 

New for 1986 was the Aerocoupe model. Modifications to the Super Sport body included a more deeply sloped rear window and a shorter trunk lid sporting a spoiler that lower than the previous Super Sports version. A total of 200 Aerocoupes were sold, which was number NASCAR officials required for road model features to be incorporated into the racing cars. All 200 were built in Arlington, Texas, finished in white with burgundy interior and sent to Cars & Concepts in Michigan for the conversion.

1987 

In 1987, Chevrolet eliminated the Sport Coupe version of the Monte Carlo, leaving the LS, SS, and Aerocoupe. The Super Sport incorporated the "smoothed" rear bumper and tail lamps first introduced on the 1986 Luxury Sport and midway through the production year introduced the "lay-down" spoiler. The Aerocoupe made up 6,052 of the 39,251 Super Sports that were produced that year. A total of 39,794 Luxury Sports were produced in 1987.

1988 
1988 was the final year for the fourth-generation Monte Carlo. The 1988 models were actually built in late 1987, with only 16,204 SSs made for an asking price of US$19,320. Appearance and mechanicals were similar to the 1987 model. The 1988 model only came with the lay-down style spoiler, unlike the 1987 model, which came with either the lay-down or stand-up type spoiler. The Aerocoupe did not return, as Chevrolet had unveiled plans to produce the Lumina and race that body style in NASCAR. The new Lumina body style was much more aerodynamic and negated the need for a "sleeker" version of the Monte Carlo SS. The Lumina coupe was introduced as a 1990 model to replace the Monte Carlo. Total production numbers for the final year of the rear-wheel drive Monte Carlo was 30,174 — almost half of the 1987 numbers. The final G-body Monte Carlo – a silver SS coupe — was produced on December 12, 1987, which rolled off the GM Arlington Assembly plant. Total SS production for 1988 was 16,204.

Production Figures:

Fifth generation (1995–1999)

For the 1995 model year, the mid-size Lumina was split into two models with the sedan continuing as the Lumina and the coupe reviving the Monte Carlo nameplate for its fifth generation. The new car rode on an updated W-body chassis shared with the Lumina, Pontiac Grand Prix, Oldsmobile Cutlass Supreme, Oldsmobile Intrigue, Buick Century, and Buick Regal, and by its nature was the first front-wheel drive Monte Carlo. For 1995, the LS was $16,770 and the Z34 was $18,970. All 1995–1999 Monte Carlos were built in Oshawa, Ontario, Canada from February 14, 1994 until September 1999. Unlike Monte Carlos of previous years, the distinctive bulges to the front fenders and rear quarter panels were gone. A special run of 400 1995 Z34s were made called the Monte Carlo Brickyard 400 Pace Car. The $2195 option included interior ornamentation, embroidered leather 45/55 seating with a full floor console, an aero wing spoiler, and an accent stripe package.

Throughout these five model years, the Monte Carlo was available in two trims, the LS and the Z34. Appearances were largely identical between the two models. Styling changes consisted mainly of the special red-colored badging, a lower front air dam, and blacked-out trim on the Z34, the real difference being under the hood. LS models were powered by the 3.1 L 3100 V6 producing  at 5200 rpm (119 kW) and 185 lb·ft (251 Nm) while Z34's featured a more powerful 3.4 L DOHC V6 engine with 215 hp (160 kW) and 220 lb·ft (298 Nm). Aside from minor equipment changes, the fifth generation remained virtually unchanged during its run. In 1998, the 3.4 L was replaced with the 3800 Series II which cranked out 200 hp and 225 lb·ft of torque.

All Z34 models came with 16-inch alloy wheels, optional on LS models in place of the standard 15-inch steel wheels with bolt-on wheel covers. 1998–1999 Z34 models received redesigned 16-inch wheels, though the previous-style Z34 alloys remained on the LS.

1997 models added daytime running lights as standard to the standard dual airbags and ABS. Rear visibility was poor. Also, again Chevrolet made a limited production run of Monte Carlo Brickyard 400 pace cars, though none were available for consumers. This generation of the Monte Carlo was the last 2-door non-truck vehicle featuring 6-passenger seating, although bucket seats were available as an option with a floor-mounted shifter. Though derided by some for its indistinct lines (called the 'Lumina Carlo') and its front-wheel drive drivetrain, the fifth generation sold well enough for Chevrolet to continue the line with a more original redesign in 1999.

Production totals

Models

Sixth generation (2000–2007)

2000–2005
For 2000, Chevrolet not only again called upon GM Motorsports for design inspiration, but also to Monte Carlos of the past. Among the traits carried over from older Monte Carlos were the stylized wheel flares, vertically oriented tail lamps, and a stylized rear bumper. Another classic trait for 2000 was the return of the "knight" badging, as well as a full gauge cluster, not seen on the Monte Carlo since 1988. Back again was the Super Sport moniker, replacing the Z34 designation of the fifth generation, which was a Lumina Coupe legacy. Chevrolet also retired the Lumina name, bringing back the Impala nameplate for the Monte Carlo's sedan counterpart. At the request of racing teams, Chevrolet stylists added a slight "hump" on the rear trunk – similar to, although smaller than, a Lincoln Mark VIII. It was a distinct trait that stayed with Monte Carlo until its demise, even though later in the generation every trim level would get a spoiler that all but masked the hump. From the NASCAR circuit came the aerodynamic styling and ducktail spoiler. The 6th generation Monte Carlo is based on the Monte Carlo "Intimidator" concept car, produced in 1997. Trim levels initially consisted of the LS, and SS, the latter being the first front-wheel drive SS in the Chevrolet lineup. The LS used a 3.4 L OHV V6, while the SS got the 3.8 L V6. A Supercharged SS model was added for 2004 and 2005; the naturally aspirated SS continued as well, but was relabeled as LT for MY 2005.

2006–2007
 

The facelifted 2006 Monte Carlo and the companion Impala sedan were introduced at the 2005 Los Angeles Auto Show. The base engine was a 3.5 L V6 producing 211 hp (156 kW). Trim series for this generation include the entry-level LS, the mid-level LT, the upper-level LTZ and, the top-of-the-line SS. Only 14,829 SS models were produced over the two years, 8,794 in 2006 and 6,035 in 2007. The most notable news, though, was the SS model's use of the generation IV small-block V8 — the first V8 since the 1988 model. The 5.3 L V8 produced 303 hp (226 kW). The interior for 2006 was mildly redesigned.

The revised model also added an improved interior with expanded Driver Information Center (DIC), enhanced ABS and traction control, as well as optional, seat-mounted side airbags for the front driver and passenger.

The LT and LTZ models were available with the 3.9 L engine in 2006. For 2007 the LTZ model was dropped along with the engine in favor of the Flex Fuel 3.5 L as the exclusive engine for non-SS models.

Specialty nameplates
Chevrolet released several models inspired by then-current NASCAR drivers:
The first model released was the 2002 Dale Earnhardt Signature Edition, also referred to as Intimidator Edition. This car had two color schemes; a black body with galaxy silver rocker panels and front and rear air dams, and an all-black body with black ground effects. A thin red stripe above the silver ground effects was also included. Just behind the rear side windows, the Dale Number 3 logo was placed with Earnhardt's signature below the Number 3 logo. The car also featured silver "Intimidator" SS badges on the right side of the trunk and standard Monte Carlo SS badges the bottom of the vehicle, just in front of the rear tires. An Intimidator badge with the number 3 also appeared on the dash, and Earnhardt’s signature appeared on the gauge cluster. The interior is all black ("charcoal") leather. This edition also came with 5-spoke, diamond cut wheels, and received GMs L36 3800 V6 engine.

In 2003, the Jeff Gordon edition was released. The vehicle came with a superior blue body and silver ground effects, just like the Intimidator Edition; however, the Jeff Gordon edition also received lighter blue ghost flames on the body. It featured the number 24 behind the rear side windows. A Jeff Gordon signature was placed on the right side of the trunk and inside the car received a Jeff Gordon badge on the dashboard and a two-tone gray and black leather-wrapped steering wheel and shift knob. It featured 5-spoke, diamond-cut wheels and included GMs L36 3800 V6 engine.

In 2004 the Dale Jr. Edition came out, it was red in color with a black high sport kit. The number 8, with an “E” stripe design carried from the doors to the rear bumper. The 5-spoke diamond cut wheels featured a black stripe through each spoke and Dale Jr.'s signature appeared on the right side of the trunk lid. On the sides, the vehicle received Supercharged SS badges. Inside on the dash, a #8 badge appeared, and Dale Jr.'s signature was on the cluster. This edition also featured the #8 on floor mats and headrests. This was also the first nameplate car to receive GMs L67 Supercharged 3800 V6 engine. The fan speed for heat and air conditioning was changed from previous years 5 settings to 10.

The Intimidator Edition was re-released in 2004. However, the vehicle featured "Intimidator" badges on the trunk lid and both side panels of the vehicle. The car was all black in color, received the 5 spoke, diamond cut wheels and this time received GMs L67 Supercharged 3800 V6 engine.

The 2005 featured the final commemorative edition, the Tony Stewart version. It was all black, but featured a white/orange line that thickened as it reached the back of the vehicle and contained number 20 just before the rear tires. Tony Stewart’s signature also appeared behind the rear windows on both sides. The Chevy bowtie on the trunk was white on this edition and another was painted on the front of the hood. The Monte Carlo badge was removed and instead replaced by the black Tony Stewart grille. The wheels were the same design as the Dale Jr. Edition, except the bowtie on the center cap was white this time. This edition also received GMs L67 Supercharged 3800 V6 engine.

Pace Car Editions

General Motors released several Monte Carlos branded as "Pace Car" replicas. Each year featured a different color and were limited production, however; all cars had some things in common. All pace cars received:
Galaxy Silver ground effects, checkered flagging on fenders & doors, "Tasmanian Devil" decals on quarter panels, and trunk lid behind the "Monte Carlo" script. It also has a "race-inspired" rear spoiler that resembles the look of the NASCAR spoiler, limited edition plaque on the trunk lid, "Monte Carlo" script on the dash is replaced with "PACE CAR", Gauge cluster displays "LIMITED EDITION" below the speedometer where it would say "Apply Brake To Shift From Park," 16-inch diamond-cut cast-aluminum wheels, door opening kick plates featuring the Monte Carlo nameplate, and stainless-steel dual exhaust tips. Interiors had two-tone leather from 1999 through 2002 to match the exterior with 2003 being solid black and Chevy "bow-tie" embroidered headrests. All cars also came with GMs L36 3800 V6 engine.
 2000 Pace Car:
Production limited to 2,222 cars.
Sports two-tone leather black and red.
Exterior: Torch Red with Galaxy Silver ground effects.
 2001 Pace Car:
Production limited to 1,300 cars.
Sports two-tone leather black and silver.
Exterior: Black with Galaxy Silver ground effects.
 2002 Pace Car:
Production limited to 1,150 cars.
Sports two-tone leather black.
Exterior: Competition Yellow with Galaxy Silver ground effects.
 2003 Pace Car:
Production limited to 1,401 cars.
Sports leather Ebony Black seats with ebony and gray leather-wrapped steering wheel.
Exterior: Superior Blue Metallic with Galaxy Silver ground effects.

Engines

Production totals

Production of the 2006–2007 SS totaled 14,829 units.

Discontinuation
The Monte Carlo ceased production at Oshawa Car Assembly Plant #1 on June 19, 2007, following an announcement in February 2007 of its demise. On Tuesday, June 19, 2007, the last two 2007 Chevrolet Monte Carlo models rolled off the line at the Oshawa Assembly Plant. The last two models were identical "SS" models with Precision Red exterior paint, silver rally stripes, and Ebony Nuance leather interior. The vehicle was discontinued due to declining sales in coupes in general and the company's plans to revive the Chevrolet Camaro, which would cannibalize sales of the Monte Carlo.

The final Monte Carlo off the production line was retained by GM for their Heritage Center collection. The second-to-last Monte off the line, the last "saleable" unit, was auctioned off on August 15, at Manheim's Statesville Auto Auction in Statesville, North Carolina. The winning bid went to Fred Simon, owner of Simon Chevrolet in Woonsocket, RI where it is on display on the dealership floor. This unit was at the Indianapolis Motor Speedway over the weekend of July 27–29 for the 2007 Allstate 400 at the Brickyard. While there, it was signed by all the current Team Chevrolet drivers who were active in the NASCAR Nextel Cup Series.

NASCAR

From 1971 until the car's end of production in 1988, the Monte Carlo campaigned in NASCAR racing. The 1973–1977 cars were the dominant body style through the years until 1980, when NASCAR mandated a move to the shorter  wheelbase cars being built by Detroit. The 1981 and 1982 (referred to as the "flat-nose") Monte Carlo was raced by few teams and only won two races in those years. In 1983, the addition of the SS nose became the Monte Carlo body style used in NASCAR until the car went out of production.

 

The Monte Carlo returned for the 1995 season with the fifth-generation body, but NASCAR allowed the car to have wider rear quarter panels, and as such deviated from factory sheet metal, that up until that time the race-spec cars had to use. The 1995 body style was also a favorite on the NASCAR circuit and enjoyed considerable success at the track. The car captured several NASCAR Manufacturers Cup awards until it again was discontinued from production in 2007, and replaced by the Impala for racing.

Notes

External links

 

Monte Carlo
Front-wheel-drive vehicles
Rear-wheel-drive vehicles
Mid-size cars
Coupés
Muscle cars
Cars introduced in 1970
1980s cars
1990s cars
2000s cars
Motor vehicles manufactured in the United States
Personal luxury cars